J.League Manager of the Year is an annual award given to one manager by the J.League based on their performance during the season. In the past, the award usually went to the manager of the champions, though this has varied somewhat over the years. From 2017, the award was modified so that the Manager of the J.League champion wins the J.League Champion Manager of the Year, and a separate J.League Manager of the Year award is given to a Manager from each of the J.Leagues (J1, J2 and J3). The list below reflects the award for J1 League Manager of the Year award only.

Winners

Wins by Club

See also
J.League awards

References

 ULTRAZONE Website : All-Time Award Winners 

J.League trophies and awards
Annual events in Japan